Badminton at the 1959 Southeast Asian Peninsular Games is held in Bangkok, Thailand from 12 to 17 December 1959. Two competitions were held in men singles and in men doubles.

Medalists

Medal table

References
https://eresources.nlb.gov.sg/newspapers/Digitised/Article/straitstimes19591217-1.2.109
https://eresources.nlb.gov.sg/newspapers/Digitised/Article/straitstimes19591223-1.2.169

Badminton
Southeast Asian Games
Multi-sport events, Southeast Asian Games
Multi-sport events, Southeast Asian Games